Rekha is an Indian actress who has had a prolific career in Hindi films, and is acknowledged as one of the finest actresses of Indian cinema. She first appeared as a child artist in two Telugu-language films Inti Guttu (1958) and Rangula Ratnam (1966), but her career as a lead started with the Kannada film Operation Jackpot Nalli C.I.D 999 in 1969. In that same year, she starred in her first Hindi film, Anjana Safar, which was delayed for ten years due to censorship problems. Her first Hindi release was Sawan Bhadon (1970), a commercial success which established her as a rising star. She followed with roles in Raampur Ka Lakshman (1972), Kahani Kismat Ki (1973), and Pran Jaye Par Vachan Na Jaye (1974), to mainstream success but little recognition for her acting, and press criticism of her looks and overweight. Rekha was motivated to improve her acting and appearance and managed a well-publicised transformation, both physically and in terms of her screen persona and command of the Hindi language. Her work in the 1976 drama Do Anjaane was better received, and critical recognition of her roles as a rape victim in Ghar and a courtesan in Muqaddar Ka Sikandar (1978) marked the beginning of the most successful period of her career.

Through most of the 1980s and early 1990s, she was one of the leading actresses in Hindi cinema. Her comic role in Khubsoorat (1980) earned her a first Filmfare Award for Best Actress. Further mainstream success came with roles in a myriad of family and drama films such as Baseraa (1981), Silsila (1981), Ek Hi Bhool (1981), Jeevan Dhaara (1982), and Agar Tum Na Hote (1983). During this period, she extended her work into arthouse films, a movement of neo-realist films known in India as parallel cinema, often to favourable reviews. These films included Kalyug (1981), Umrao Jaan (1981), Vijeta (1982), Utsav (1984), and Ijaazat (1987). Her acclaimed portrayal of the eponymous classical courtesan in Umrao Jaan won her the National Film Award for Best Actress. Her work during the decade included sporadic dubbing and playback singing. Having credited her physical change to diet and yoga practice, she released an exercise video, Rekha's Mind and Body Temple (1983). A period of decline during the middle of the decade was followed by Khoon Bhari Maang, among the first of a new trend of women-centred revenge films, which starred Rekha in the role of a woman avenging her attempted murder by her husband, and earned her a second Best Actress Filmfare Award.

Her work was much less frequent in subsequent decades. Most of her films in early 1990s mostly met with lukewarm reviews and were rejected by the audience. She was cast in several parts similar to that in Khoon Bhari Maang, the great majority of which failed to leave a similar mark, except for considerable success with Phool Bane Angaray (1991). In 1996, she won a third Filmfare Award, in the Best Supporting Actress category, for her negative turn of an underworld don in the action thriller Khiladiyon Ka Khiladi (1996), one of the year's highest-earning Hindi films. She accepted parts in two controversial films: a Kama Sutra instructor in Kama Sutra: A Tale of Love (1996) and a housewife moonlighting as a prostitute in Aastha: In the Prison of Spring (1997), to critical acclaim but some public scrutiny. In the 2000s, she was praised for her supporting roles in the 2001 dramas Zubeidaa and Lajja, and started playing mother roles, among which was her role in the science fiction Koi... Mil Gaya (2003) and its superhero sequel Krrish (2006). While her leading roles in the comedies Bachke Rehna Re Baba (2005) and Kudiyon Ka Hai Zamana (2006) were met with disapproval by critics, her supporting part in Yatra (2006) was better reviewed. This was followed by a long hiatus from film work, during which she appeared twice over the following decade in Sadiyaan (2010) and Super Nani (2014).

Films

Dubbing

Playback singing

Exercise video

See also
 List of awards and nominations received by Rekha

Footnotes

References

Bibliography
 
 
 
 
 
 
 

Indian filmographies